Sielec is a district in the city of Tarnobrzeg, Poland.

Sielec is a  former royal village in Podkarpackie Voivodeship, Poland, which was incorporated into Tarnobrzeg in 1975. It is located in northern part of the town, bordering Wielowieś, Sobów and Zakrzów.

Districts of Tarnobrzeg